Franco Volpi  (Vicenza, 4 October 1952 – 14 April 2009), was a philosopher, historian of philosophy and a professor at Padua University, who wrote regularly to the Italian newspaper La Repubblica. Volpi was an expert in German philosophy; in particular, Martin Heidegger and Arthur Schopenhauer. He investigated the relation between nihilism and the nothing, and between philosophy and current psychology. In one of his works, he stated that "real philosophical questions have a history but have no answer." For him, nihilism undermines truth, weakens religion, and dissolves dogmatism.

Volpi also taught at the University of Witten/Herdecke as well as the Universities of Laval, Poitiers, and Nice.

Volpi died on 14 April 2009, at the age of 56, after being run over by an automobile as he rode his bicycle.

Works
 Heidegger e Brentano. L'aristotelismo e il problema dell'univocità dell'essere nella formazione filosofica del giovane Martin Heidegger, Cedam, Padova, 1976, pp. 144
 La rinascita della filosofia pratica in Germania, Francisci, Albano/Padova, 1980 in:Filosofia pratica e scienza politica, Francisci, Abano/Padova, 1980, pp. 180 (con Carlo Natali, Laura Iseppi, Claudio Pacchiani)
 Heidegger e Aristotele, Daphne, Padova, 1984, pp. 226 (ristampa Bari, Laterza, 2010)
 Lexikon der philosophischen Werke, Kröner, Stuttgart, 1988
 Sulla fortuna del concetto di decadence nella cultura tedesca: Nietzsche e le sue fonti francesi, "Filosofia politica", 1995
 Il nichilismo, Biblioteca Universale Laterza, Laterza, Roma-Bari, pp. IV-152; trad. port. O niilismo, Edicoes Loyola, São Paulo, 1999, pp. 163
 Guida a Heidegger, Laterza, Roma-Bari 1997, 19982, pp. XVI-387
 Hegel e i suoi critici, Per i licei e gli istituti magistrali, Laterza, Roma-Bari 1998

References

Sources 
 
 
 
 
 
 
 
 
 
 
 
 
 
 
 
 

20th-century Italian philosophers
Road incident deaths in Italy
1952 births
2009 deaths